Demon Copperhead is a 2022 novel by Barbara Kingsolver. Demon Copperhead is a nickname for the narrator, Damon. The novel borrows its narrative structure from the Charles Dickens novel David Copperfield.

It was named one of the "10 Best Books of 2022" by The Washington Post and The New York Times.

Reception 
According to the review aggregator website Books Marks, Demon Copperhead received mostly positive reviews from critics. Ron Charles of The Washington Post praises Demon Copperhead as his "favorite novel of 2022" as it is "equal parts hilarious and heartbreaking, this is the story of an irrepressible boy nobody wants, but readers will love." Writing for The Guardian, Elizabeth Lowry contends that "while the task of modernising [Dicken's] novel is complicated by the fact that mores have shifted so radically since the mid-19th century … the ferocious critique of institutional poverty and its damaging effects on children is as pertinent as ever."

References 

2022 American novels
HarperCollins books
Novels by Barbara Kingsolver
Novels about orphans
Novels about substance abuse
Novels set in Appalachia
Novels set in Virginia